Academy SC
 Bodden Town FC
 Cayman Athletic SC
 East End United
 Elite SC
 FC International
 Future FC
 George Town SC
 Roma United SC
 Scholars International FC
 Tigers FC
 Western Union FC
345 FC

 
Cayman Islands
Football clubs
Football